Radoslav Tybor (born 23 November 1989) is a Slovak ice hockey player who is currently playing for HC Košice of the Slovak Extraliga.

Career
Tybor participated at the 2009 World Junior Ice Hockey Championships, recording three points in seven games. The Slovakia junior team finished fourth at the tournament. He debuted for the Slovakia senior team at the Deutschland Cup in 2011.

Career statistics

Regular season and playoffs

International

External links

1989 births
Living people
Sportspeople from Trenčín
Slovak ice hockey right wingers
HK Dukla Trenčín players
HC Dynamo Pardubice players
HC Oceláři Třinec players
HC Vítkovice players
HC Košice players
Slovak expatriate ice hockey players in the Czech Republic